Place LaRue is a commercial neighbourhood located in west Edmonton, Alberta, Canada.  According to the 2001 federal census, there were only 75 private dwellings located in the neighbourhood.  By 2005, this had declined to 51.  As of the 2019 municipal census, the population is 0.

The neighbourhood is bounded by 170 Street on the east, Anthony Henday Drive to the west, Stony Plain Road to the north, and 100 Avenue (west of 176 Street) and 99A Avenue (east of 176 Street) to the south.

Surrounding neighbourhoods

References

External links 
 Place LaRue neighbourhood profile

Neighbourhoods in Edmonton